Bruskowo Wielkie  is a village in the administrative district of Gmina Słupsk, within Słupsk County, Pomeranian Voivodeship, in northern Poland.

In the 18th century the town was a manor farm which belonged to the rural district around the town of Słupsk, called Amt Stolp.  In 1939 the village had 88 agricultural holdings.

The village has a population of 341.

On the area of the community, there is at 54°30'5"N   16°53'28"E  the static inverter plant of SwePol HVDC to which also belongs a 380 kV/110 kV-substation.

References

Bruskowo Wielkie